Two submarines of the French Navy have borne the name Daphné:

 , a  launched in 1915 and struck in 1935.
 , a  completed in 1964 and struck in 1989.

French Navy ship names